Dreier is German for "three-er" and may refer to:

 Dreier (coin), an historical German coin
 Dreier (Königrufen), a contract in the Tarot game of Königrufen
 Dreier (surname), people with the surname
 Dreier (Tapp Tarock), a contract in the Tarot game of Tapp Tarock

See also 
 Dreierles
 Dreyer